'Kęstutis Antanėlis (28 March 1951 – 12 October 2020) was a Lithuanian composer, architect, and sculptor.

Career
Kestutis Antanelis was born Vilnius. In 1975 he graduated from Vilnius Gediminas Technical University (former V.I.S.I.) and later from the Vilnius Academy of Fine Arts.
As an architect he designed buildings, interiors, furniture (the Republic of Lithuania credentials Hall, 1995), and a stained-glass office building. As an artist he created various sculptures.

As a composer he wrote nearly 200 songs and about 80 instrumental pieces.
In 1971 he was the first in Europe and the second in the world to stage Andrew Lloyd Webber rock opera Jesus Christ Superstar.

He was noted for his work on the rock opera Love and Death in Verona, and staging and singing in Romeo and Juliet in Vilnius in 1982. In 1998, he performed at the Internationale Maifestspiele Wiesbaden in Germany. In 1997 he staged the opera Peer Gynt.

References

External links
balsas
 
This article was initially translated from the Lithuanian Wikipedia.

Lithuanian composers
Architects from Vilnius
20th-century Lithuanian sculptors
1951 births
2020 deaths
Vilnius Gediminas Technical University alumni
Musicians from Vilnius
Vilnius Academy of Arts alumni
20th-century composers
20th-century architects
20th-century Lithuanian male musicians
21st-century Lithuanian sculptors
21st-century composers
21st-century architects
21st-century Lithuanian male musicians
20th-century Lithuanian male artists
21st-century Lithuanian male artists